Burrs County Park is the East Lancashire Railway's seventh station. It was opened in October 2016 and since January 2017, has seen regular passenger services.

References

Railway stations in Great Britain opened in 2016
Railway stations built for UK heritage railways